SM UC-5 was a German Type UC I minelayer submarine or U-boat in the German Imperial Navy during World War I. The U-boat had been ordered by November 1914 and was launched on 13 June 1915. She was commissioned into the German Imperial Navy on 19 June 1915 as SM UC-5. She served in World War I under the command of Herbert Pustkuchen (June - December 1915) and Ulrich Mohrbutter (December 1915 - April 1916).

She ran aground and was abandoned but recovered by the Allies and displayed for propaganda purposes.

Design
A German Type UC I submarine, UC-5 had a displacement of  when at the surface and  while submerged. The submarine was powered by one Daimler-Motoren-Gesellschaft six-cylinder, four-stroke diesel engine producing , an electric motor producing , and one propeller shaft.

UC-5 was fitted with six  mine tubes, twelve UC 120 mines, and one  machine gun. She was built by AG Vulcan Stettin and her complement was fourteen crew members.

Service
UC-5 had an impressive career, with 30 ships sunk for a total of 36,126 GRT and 1,105 tons on 29 patrols. On August 21, 1915 UC-5 became the first submarine minelayer to penetrate into the English Channel, laying 12 mines off Boulogne, one of which sank the steamship William Dawson the same day. UC-5 went on to lay 6 more mines off Boulogne and Folkestone on 7 September, one of which sank the cable layer Monarch.

Fate

The U-boat was salvaged and put into a floating dock by teams from Harwich and Chatham, led by Captain Young and Lt Paterson--a dangerous procedure because of the two mines still on board. Her captain had also rigged up explosive charges to wreck his ship in the event of abandoning, which the British press described as an attempt to kill the RN personnel who rescued his crew. Paterson was able to find and disable them after being warned by one of the prisoners. The U-Boat was towed first to Harwich, then on to Sheerness, where an approved party of journalists and even two war artists were taken to inspect it. 
(Refs: Nore Command Records ADM 151/83 at UK National Archives, E F Knight "The Harwich Force", contemporary editions of Daily Telegraph & Daily Mail'').

Later it was towed up and displayed to the London public at Temple Pier on the Thames river and, the following year, in New York for propaganda purposes.

Summary of raiding history

Notes

References

Bibliography

 
 
 

German Type UC I submarines
U-boats commissioned in 1915
World War I submarines of Germany
World War I shipwrecks in the North Sea
SM UC-5
1915 ships
World War I minelayers of Germany
Maritime incidents in 1916
Ships built in Bremen (state)